Dafeng Port railway is a branch from the Xinyi–Changxing railway situated in Yancheng, Jiangsu, China. Construction started on 27 September 2022.

Route
Dafeng Port railway leaves the Xinyi–Changxing railway south of Dafeng West railway station and heads east towards the coast.

References

Railway lines in China